The Ship of State is an ancient and oft-cited metaphor, famously expounded by Plato in the Republic (Book 6, 488a–489d), which likens the governance of a city-state to the command of a vessel. Plato expands the established metaphor and ultimately argues that the only people fit to be captain of the ship are philosopher kings, benevolent men with absolute power who have access to the Form of the Good. The origins of the metaphor can be traced back to the lyric poet Alcaeus (fragments 6, 208, 249), and it is also found in Aeschylus' Seven Against Thebes, Sophocles' Antigone and Aristophanes' Wasps before Plato.

Plato's use of the metaphor
Plato establishes the comparison by saying that Zeus was one of the best models of describing the steering of a ship as just like any other "craft" or profession—in particular, that of a statesman.  He then runs the metaphor in reference to a particular type of government: democracy.  Plato's democracy is not the modern notion of a mix of democracy and republicanism, but rather direct democracy by way of pure majority rule.  In the metaphor, found at 488a–489d, Plato's Socrates compares the population at large to a strong but near-sighted shipowner whose knowledge of seafaring is lacking. The quarreling sailors are demagogues and politicians, and the ship's navigator, a stargazer, is the philosopher. The sailors flatter themselves with claims to knowledge of sailing, though they know nothing of navigation, and are constantly vying with one another for the approval of the shipowner so to captain the ship, going so far as to stupefy the shipowner with drugs and wine. Meanwhile, they dismiss the navigator as a useless stargazer, though he is the only one with adequate knowledge to direct the ship's course.

Metaphor 
The metaphor of the ship of state:

The Ship of State since Plato
Reference to it has been made routinely throughout Western culture ever since its inception; two notable literary examples are Horace's ode 1.14 and "O Ship of State" by Henry Wadsworth Longfellow. Roger Williams, the founder of Rhode Island, used the metaphor in his "Letter to the Town of Providence" (1656). The Jacobins of the French Revolution frequently used this reference for the new French Republic as it defended itself from several European monarchies. 

Thomas Carlyle used it to inveigh against the democratic movements of his time. More recently, it has become a staple of American political discussion, where it is viewed simply as its image of the state as a ship, in need of a government as officers to command it—and conspicuously absent of its anti-democratic, pro-absolutist original meaning.

The term has entered popular culture as well. Leonard Cohen's song "Democracy" contains the line "Sail on. Sail on, o mighty ship of state. To the shores of need, past the reefs of greed, through the squalls of hate." Also, in his second novel Beautiful Losers (1966), Cohen writes "Sail on, sail on, O Ship of State, auto accidents, births, Berlin, cures for cancer!" (p. 12). In the British TV series Yes, Minister, Sir Humphrey Appleby pointed out that "the Ship of State is the only ship that leaks from the top".

See also
 Allegorical interpretations of Plato
 Collective intelligence
 Plato's political philosophy
 Spaceship Earth

References

External links
 Longfellow's "O Ship of State".
 Text of book VI of Plato's Republic.

Metaphors referring to ships
Platonism
Political concepts
Political philosophy in ancient Greece